The 1937 West Tennessee State Teachers football team was an American football team that represented the West Tennessee State Teachers College (now known as the University of Memphis) as a member of the Southern Intercollegiate Athletic Association during the 1937 college football season. In their first season under head coach Allyn McKeen, West Tennessee State Teachers compiled a 3–6 record.

Schedule

References

West Tennessee State Teachers
Memphis Tigers football seasons
West Tennessee State Teachers football